Frederick Adolphus Porcher (January 16, 1809 – October 15, 1888) was an American politician and educator.

Porcher was born January 16, 1809, at Cedar Spring plantation, near Charleston, S. C. His earlier years were passed in Pineville, and he has left in his history of Craven County a sketch of the life and manners of this place, typical of life in lower Carolina at the beginning of the nineteenth century.  He graduated from Yale College in 1828.  Three years after graduation he was elected a member of the South Carolina State Legislature, and served thus for several terms. Politics were, however, distasteful to him after the first draught,  neither did a planter's life satisfy him ; so he became in 1849 a member of the Faculty of the College of Charleston as Professor of Belles Lettres and History. He continued in active service until 1881, after which he lectured to the advanced classes until prevented by feeble health in 1886.  He was one of the founders of the South Carolina Historical Society, and its president from 1856 until his death.

Three daughters survived him. He died after an illness of two years on October 15, 1888, in his 80th year.

External links
 
 Porcher family papers , South Carolina Historical Society
 Frederick A. Porcher Papers, College of Charleston

1809 births
1888 deaths
Politicians from Charleston, South Carolina
Members of the South Carolina General Assembly
College of Charleston faculty
American Anglo-Catholics
19th-century American politicians
Yale College alumni